Haugsrud is a Norwegian surname. Notable people with the surname include:

 Ole Haugsrud (1899–1976), American sports executive
 Per Haugsrud (born 1965), Norwegian golfer

See also
 Haugerud (disambiguation)

Norwegian-language surnames